Gary Leon Ridgway (born February 18, 1949), also known as the Green River Killer, is an American serial killer and sex offender. He was initially convicted of 48 separate murders. As part of his plea bargain, another conviction was added, bringing the total number of convictions to 49, making him the second most prolific serial killer in United States history according to confirmed murders. He killed many teenage girls and women in the U.S. state of Washington during the 1980s and 1990s.

Most of Ridgway's victims were alleged to be sex workers and other women in vulnerable circumstances, including underage runaways. The press gave him his nickname after the first five victims were found in the Green River before his identity was known. He strangled his victims, usually by hand but sometimes using ligatures. After strangling them, he would dump their bodies in forested and overgrown areas in King County, often returning to the bodies to have sexual intercourse with them.

On November 30, 2001, as Ridgway was leaving the Kenworth truck factory where he worked in Renton, Washington, he was arrested for the murders of four women whose cases were linked to him through DNA profiling evidence. As part of a plea bargain wherein he agreed to disclose the locations of still-missing women, he was spared the death penalty and received a sentence of life imprisonment without the possibility of parole.

Early life
Gary Leon Ridgway was born on February 18, 1949, in Salt Lake City, Utah, the second of Mary and Thomas Ridgway's three sons. His home life was somewhat troubled; relatives have described his mother as domineering and have said that, while young, he witnessed more than one violent argument between his parents. His father was a bus driver who would often complain about the presence of sex workers.

Ridgway had a bed-wetting problem until he was 13, and his mother would wash his genitals after every episode. He would later tell defense psychologists that, as an adolescent, he had conflicting feelings of anger and sexual attraction toward his mother, and fantasized about killing her.

Ridgway is dyslexic, and was held back a year in high school. When he was 16, he stabbed a six-year-old boy who survived the attack. Ridgway had led the boy into the woods and then stabbed him through the ribs into his liver.

Ridgway's IQ was recorded as being in the "low eighties".

Adult life
Ridgway graduated from Tyee High School in 1969 and married his 19-year-old high school girlfriend, Claudia Kraig. He joined the United States Navy and was sent to Vietnam, where he served on board a supply ship and saw combat. During his time in the military, Ridgway had frequent sexual intercourse with sex workers and contracted gonorrhea; although angered by this, he continued this activity without protection. The marriage ended within a year.

When questioned about Ridgway after his arrest, friends and family described him as friendly but strange. His first two marriages resulted in divorce because of infidelities by both partners. His second wife, Marcia Winslow, claimed that he had placed her in a chokehold. He became religious during his second marriage, proselytizing door-to-door, reading the Bible aloud at work and at home, and insisting that his wife follow the strict teachings of their pastor. Ridgway would also frequently cry after sermons or reading the Bible. Despite his beliefs, Ridgway continued to solicit the services of sex workers and wanted his wife to participate in sex in public and inappropriate places, sometimes even in areas where his victims' bodies were later discovered.

According to women in his life, Ridgway had an insatiable sexual appetite. His three ex-wives and several ex-girlfriends reported that he demanded sex from them several times a day. Often, he would want to have sex in a public area or in the woods. Ridgway himself admitted to having a fixation with sex workers, with whom he had a love/hate relationship. He frequently complained about their presence in his neighborhood, but he also took advantage of their services regularly. In a statement read at his plea hearing, Gary Ridgway said he hated prostitutes and didn't want to pay them for sex. Some have speculated that Ridgway was torn between his lusts and his staunch religious beliefs.

With his second wife Marcia, Ridgway had a son, Matthew (b. 1975).

Murders 

Throughout the 1980s and 1990s, Ridgway is believed to have murdered at least 71 teenage girls and women near Seattle and Tacoma, Washington. In court statements, Ridgway later reported that he had killed so many that he lost count. A majority of the murders occurred between 1982 and 1984. The victims were believed to be either sex workers or runaways, whom he picked up along Pacific Highway South. Ridgway sometimes showed the women a picture of his son, to trick them into trusting him. They would engage in sexual activity, and after minutes of intercourse from behind, Ridgway would wrap his forearm around the front of their necks and use the other arm to pull back as tightly as he could, strangling them. He killed most victims in his home, his truck, or a secluded area. Most of their bodies were dumped in wooded areas around the Green River, Seattle–Tacoma International Airport, and other "dump sites" within South King County.

There were also two confirmed and another two suspected victims found in the Portland, Oregon, area. The bodies were often left in clusters, sometimes posed, usually nude. He would sometimes return to the victims' bodies and have sexual intercourse with them. Ridgway later explained that he did not find necrophilia more sexually satisfying, but having sex with the deceased reduced his need to obtain a living victim and thus limited his exposure to being caught. Because most of the bodies were not discovered until only the skeletons remained, two victims are still unidentified. Ridgway occasionally contaminated the dump sites with gum, cigarettes, and written materials belonging to others, and he even transported a few victims' remains across state lines into Oregon to confuse the police.

In the early 1980s, the King County Sheriff's Office formed the Green River Task Force to investigate the murders. Task force members included Robert Keppel and Dave Reichert, who periodically interviewed incarcerated serial killer Ted Bundy in 1984. Bundy offered his opinions on the psychology, motivations, and behavior of the killer. He suggested that the killer was revisiting the dump sites to have sex with his victims, which turned out to be true, and if police found a fresh grave, they should stake it out and wait for him to come back. Also contributing to the investigation was FBI Special Agent John E. Douglas, who developed a profile of the suspect.

Ridgway was arrested in 1982 and 2001 on charges related to prostitution. He became a suspect in the Green River killings in 1983. In 1984, Ridgway passed a polygraph test. On April 7, 1987, police took hair and saliva samples from Ridgway.

Around 1985, Ridgway began dating Judith Mawson, who became his third wife in 1988. Mawson claimed in a 2010 television interview that when she moved into his house while they were dating, there was no carpet. Detectives later told her he had probably wrapped a body in the carpet. In the same interview, she described how he would leave for work early in the morning some days, ostensibly for the overtime pay. Mawson speculated that he must have committed some of the murders while supposedly working these early morning shifts. She claimed that she had not suspected Ridgway's crimes before she was contacted by authorities in 1987, and had not even heard of the Green River Killer before that time because she did not watch the news.

Author Pennie Morehead interviewed Ridgway in prison, and he said while he was in the relationship with Mawson, his kill rate went down and that he truly loved her. Of his 49 known victims, only three were killed after he married Mawson. Mawson told a local television reporter, "I feel I have saved lives ... by being his wife and making him happy."

The samples collected in 1987 were later subjected to DNA profiling, providing the evidence for his arrest warrant. On November 30, 2001, Ridgway was at the Kenworth truck factory, where he worked as a spray painter, when police arrived to arrest him. Ridgway was arrested on suspicion of murdering four women nearly 20 years earlier after first being identified as a potential suspect, when DNA evidence conclusively linked semen left in the victims to the saliva swab taken by the police. The four victims named in the original indictment were Marcia Chapman, Opal Mills, Cynthia Hinds, and Carol Ann Christensen. Three more victims—Wendy Coffield, Debra Bonner, and Debra Estes—were added to the indictment after a forensic scientist identified microscopic spray paint spheres as a specific brand and composition of paint used at the Kenworth factory during the specific time frame when these victims were killed.

Plea bargain, confessions, sentencing
Early in August 2003, Seattle television news reported that Ridgway had been moved from a maximum security cell at King County Jail to an Airway Heights Minimum-Medium Security Level Tank. Other news reports stated that his lawyers, led by Anthony Savage, were closing a plea bargain that would spare him the death penalty in return for his confession to a number of the Green River murders.

On November 5, 2003, Ridgway entered a guilty plea to 48 charges of aggravated first degree murder as part of a plea bargain, agreed to in June, that would spare him execution in exchange for his cooperation in locating the remains of his victims and providing other details. In his statement accompanying his guilty plea, Ridgway explained that he had killed all of his victims inside King County, Washington, and that he had transported and dumped the remains of the two women near Portland to confuse the police.

Deputy prosecutor Jeffrey Baird noted in court that the deal contained "the names of 41 victims who would not be the subject of State v. Ridgway if it were not for the plea agreement." King County Prosecuting Attorney Norm Maleng explained his decision to make the deal:

 On December 18, 2003, King County Superior Court Judge Richard Jones sentenced Ridgway to 48 life sentences without the possibility of parole to be served consecutively. He was also sentenced to an additional 10 years for tampering with evidence for each of the 48 victims, adding 480 years to his 48 life sentences. Later given another life sentence after the remains of his 49th victim were found.

Ridgway led prosecutors to three bodies in 2003. On August 16 of that year, the remains of a 16-year-old girl found near Enumclaw, Washington, 40 feet from State Route 410, were pronounced as belonging to Pammy Annette Avent, who had been believed to be a victim of the Green River Killer. The remains of Marie Malvar and April Buttram were found in September 2003.

On November 23, 2005, the Associated Press reported that a weekend hiker found the skull of one of the 48 women Ridgway admitted murdering in his 2003 plea bargain with King County prosecutors. The skull of another victim, Tracy Winston, who was 19 when she disappeared from Northgate Mall on September 12, 1983, was found on November 20, 2005, by a man hiking in a wooded area near Highway 18 near Issaquah, southeast of Seattle, this was the find which led to Ridgway's 49th life sentence.

Ridgway confessed to more confirmed murders than any other American serial killer. Over a period of five months of police and prosecutor interviews, he confessed to 48 murders - 42 of which were on the police's list of probable Green River Killer victims. On February 9, 2004, county prosecutors began to release the videotaped records of Ridgway's confessions. In one taped interview, he initially told investigators that he was responsible for the deaths of 65 women. In another taped interview with Reichert on December 31, 2003, Ridgway claimed to have murdered 71 victims and confessed to having had sex with them before killing them, a detail which he did not reveal until after his sentencing.

In his confession, he acknowledged that he targeted prostitutes because they were "easy to pick up" and that he "hated most of them." He confessed that he had sex with his victims' bodies after he murdered them, but claimed he began burying the later victims so that he could resist the urge to commit necrophilia.

Ridgway later said that murdering young women was his "career."

Incarceration
Ridgway was placed in solitary confinement at Washington State Penitentiary in Walla Walla in January 2004. On May 14, 2015, he was transferred to the USP Florence High, a high-security federal prison east of Cañon City, Colorado. In September 2015, after a public outcry and discussions with Governor Jay Inslee, Corrections Secretary Bernie Warner announced that Ridgway would be transferred back to Washington to be "easily accessible" for open murder investigations. Ridgway was returned by chartered plane to Washington State Penitentiary in Walla Walla from USP Florence High, on October 24, 2015.

Victims
Before Ridgway's confession, authorities had attributed 49 murders to the Green River Killer. Ridgway confessed to murdering at least 71 victims. Ridgway's victims were not women of any specific race or ethnicity, rather, they were all financially poor, younger women and girls between the ages of 14 and 26 (except for 3) whom he found in vulnerable circumstances, often working as prostitutes or having run away from home.

Confirmed
At the time of Ridgway's December 18, 2003, sentencing, authorities had been able to find at least 48 sets of remains, including victims not originally attributed to the Green River Killer. Ridgway was sentenced for the deaths of each of these 48 victims, with a plea agreement that he would "plead guilty to any and all future cases (in King County) where his confession could be corroborated by reliable evidence."

 Before Ridgway's confession, authorities had not attributed to the Green River Killer the deaths of victims Rule, Barczak, Hayes, Reeves, Yellowrobe, and Jane Doe B-20.
 Ridgway's confession and directions led police search crews to find the bodies of Avent, Buttram, and Malvar in August and September 2003.
 On Tuesday, December 21, 2010, hikers near the West Valley Highway in Auburn, Washington, found a skull in the vicinity of where Marie Malvar's remains had been found in 2003. The skull was identified as belonging to Rebecca "Becky" Marrero, who was last seen leaving the Western Six Motel at South 168th Street and Pacific Highway South on December 3, 1982. The King County Prosecutor confirmed that Ridgway would be formally charged with her murder on February 11, 2011. On February 18, 2011, he entered a guilty plea in the murder of Rebecca Marrero, adding a 49th life sentence to his existing 48. Ridgway confessed to murdering Marrero in his original plea bargain, but due to insufficient evidence, the charges could not be filed. Therefore, there is no change in his current incarceration status.
 The remains of Tracy Winston were found, without a skull, in Kent's Cottonwood Grove Park in March 1986. Winston's skull was found in November 2005 near Tiger Mountain, miles away from the discovery site of the rest of her body. Police assume someone carried it to the location.
 Sandra Denise Major was not identified until June 2012. A family member asked the King County Sheriff to investigate after seeing a TV movie about Ridgway. DNA confirmed Major's identity.
 Wendy Stephens, previously known as "Jane Doe B-10", was previously unidentified. Ridgway claimed that she was a white female in her early 20s and possibly had brown hair. Examination of the remains suggested that she was actually between 12 and 18, most likely around 15. She was later confirmed to be 14 years old. Analysis of the victim's skeleton indicated she was probably left-handed, and she had at one point in her life had skull fracture to the left temple that later healed.
 Jane Doe B-17, a still-unidentified victim, was discovered on January 2, 1986; remains that had been found in another area February 18, 1984, were later matched to this victim. In 2003, Ridgway claimed responsibility for her death.
 Jane Doe B-20, also unidentified, was discovered in August 2003. Because the remains were partial, her face could not be reconstructed and her race could not be determined, but she was estimated to have been between 13 and 24 years old at the time of her death. She was murdered between 1970 and 1993, but she is believed to have been murdered during the first decade of Ridgway's murder spree.

Task force victims list
Ridgway is suspected of—but not charged with—murdering the remaining six victims of the original list attributed to the Green River Killer. In each case, either Ridgway did not confess to the victim's death, or authorities have not been able to corroborate their suspicion with reliable evidence.

 Ridgway denied killing Amina Agisheff. Agisheff does not fit the profile of any of the victims of the Green River Killer considering her age, and she was not a sex worker or a teenage runaway.
 Although he has never been charged with her murder, during police interrogations in 2003, Ridgway did confess to killing Kasee Ann Lee (née: Woods). He stated that he strangled Lee in 1982 and left her body near a drive-in theatre off of the Sea-Tac Strip. Law enforcement officials have been unable to locate Lee's remains at the dumpsite that Ridgway indicated.
 Evidence exists to suggest that Ridgway murdered Kelly Kay McGinniss. Shortly before her disappearance, McGinniss was questioned by a Port of Seattle police officer while "dating" Ridgway near the SeaTac Strip. Furthermore, during the summer of 2003, Ridgway led authorities to the bodies of several of his victims. One of those bodies, later identified as that of April Buttram, was initially identified by Ridgway as being that of McGinniss. According to Ridgway, he often confused McGinniss with Buttram because of their similar physiques.
 Ridgway is a suspect in the deaths of Angela Marie Girdner and Tammie Liles. Their bodies were discovered within a mile of the bodies of known victims Shirley Shirell and Denise Bush. Liles remained unidentified until 1998 and Girdner until October 2009.

Suspected
Ridgway has been considered a suspect in the disappearances/murders of several other women not attributed at the time to the Green River Killer. No charges have been filed.

 An unidentified black female, possibly bearing the first name Michelle, was a possible victim of Ridgway. She has never been located or identified.
 Cora McGuirk was the mother of NBA player Martell Webster. McGuirk disappeared when her son was four years old.
 Ridgway was long suspected for the 1987 murder of Rose Marie Kurran, a 16-year-old addict and prostitute, but was recently ruled out as a suspect.

Popular culture

In artwork
 In 2004, Phil Hansen created and displayed artwork depicting Gary Ridgway's face, composed of 11,792 portraits of the 48 victims.

In documentaries and films (fiction and non-fiction)

 The 1984 documentary Murder, No Apparent Motive, about serial killers and FBI Profilers, mentioned that the (then-ongoing) Green River Killer's murders were one of the latest examples of serial murders that go on in America without any apparent motives.
 Unsolved Mysteries  Season 8, Episode 15 (1996), a Green River Killer segment focused on long-time Green River Killer suspect William Stevens. The episode features interviews with Stevens' living family members. Stevens died of pancreatic cancer in 1991 at the age of 40.
 The ninth episode of the 2010 American documentary show Who the (Bleep) Did I Marry? features his story and his third wife's side of it.
 The Riverman is based on the true story of Ted Bundy assisting investigators trying to identify and catch the Green River Killer. It is based on the book of the same name by Robert D. Keppel.
 The direct-to-DVD movie Green River Killer was released in 2005.
 A 2006 episode of the TV series Crimes That Shook the World focuses on Gary Ridgway (played by Frank Violi).
 In 2008, the Lifetime Movie Network aired The Capture of the Green River Killer, a TV movie loosely based on his crimes. John Pielmeier portrays Ridgway. In 2014, they aired a documentary called My Uncle is the Green River Killer which featured Ridgway family members.
 The Court TV (now TruTV) television series Mugshots released an episode on Ridgway titled Gary Ridgway The Green River Killer, aired in 2013.
 In 2005, A&E series Cold Case Files aired an episode called Obsession: Dave Reichert and the Green River Killer. (Season 5, Episode 1)
 On June 2, 2017, HLN (Headline News) premiered the true crime series Beyond Reasonable Doubt with the episode The Green River Killer. The one-hour episode reports on the advanced trace evidence that directly link tiny paint particles from the victims' clothing to Ridgway.
 Bundy and The Green River Killer a 2019 horror film by Andrew Jones, starring Jared Nelson as Gary Ridgway.
 On February 17, 2020, Investigation Discovery premiered a two-hour special titled The Green River Killer: Mind of a Monster featuring Ridgway.
 Catching Killers, which included an episode about the Green River Case was released on Netflix on Thursday 4 November 2021. It revolves around the decade-long hunt for the murderer of several women around the Green River area – which was finally solved after a huge breakthrough in crime scene science.

In print (non-fiction)
Search for the Green River Killer by Carlton Smith and Tom Guillen (March 5, 1991)
The Riverman: Ted Bundy and I Hunt for the Green River Killer by Robert D. Keppel (November 27, 1995)
The Green River Killer by the King County Journal Staff (November 23, 2003)
Chasing the Devil by Sheriff David Reichert (July 28, 2004)
Green River, Running Red by true-crime author and former police officer Ann Rule (September 27, 2005)
Serial Killers: Issues Explored Through Green River Murders by Tomas Guillen (January 14, 2006)
Green River Serial Killer: Biography of an Unsuspecting Wife by Pennie Morehead, telling the story of his third wife and her struggles with the truth (April 1, 2007)
Case of the Green River Killer by Diane Yancey (April 27, 2007)
Defending Gary: Unraveling the Mind of the Green River Killer by Mark Prothero with help from Carlton Smith (May 25, 2007)
Green River Killer: A True Detective Story, a 2011 graphic novel by Jeff Jensen and Jonathan Case. Jensen's father was Tom Jensen, one of the detectives who worked on the case for 20 years.
The Thirty-Ninth Victim by Arleen Williams, sister of Maureen Sue Feeney (April 6, 2008)

In print (fiction)
 The Green River murders are discussed in the Jodi Picoult novel House Rules.
 The novel River by Roderick Thorp is subtitled "A Novel of the Green River Killings".
 Discussed in Stephenie Meyer's third Twilight book, Eclipse, when there are murders in Seattle.

In music
 The grunge band Green River was named in reference to the murders. As well, the title track of their 1985 debut EP Come On Down discusses the murders from Ridgway's point of view.
The 1998 song "I Wanna Know What Love Is" by Kathleen Hanna references the murders through the broader lens of police brutality.
The 2002 song "Deep Red Bells" by Neko Case was inspired by her own life growing up as a teenager near the metropolis during the time of the murders.
The industrial / power electronics project called Deathpile made an album about the Green River Killer in 2003 titled "G.R.".
The 2001 album, "Master of Brutality" by Japanese doom metal band Church of Misery also featured a song, "Green River" inspired by the murders.

In television (fiction)
 In a May 2013 interview, Veena Sud stated her inspiration for The Killing season 3 (2013) came from Streetwise, Mary Ellen Mark's book of photographs about teenaged runaways in Seattle that was made into an eponymous 1984 documentary. One of the street kids Mark documented in that and later books, 21-year-old Roberta Joseph Hayes, fell victim to the Green River Killer (Gary Ridgway). Sud said she was "very fascinated" with Ridgway, the serial killer of numerous women and girls near Seattle and Tacoma, Washington in the 1980s and 1990s.

See also 
 List of serial killers in the United States

Explanatory notes

References

Further reading
Keppel, Robert. The Riverman: Ted Bundy and I Hunt for the Green River Killer. 2004, paperback (rev. ed.). 624 pages, . Updated after the arrest and confession of Gary Ridgway.
Rule, Ann. Green River, Running Red. Pocket, 2005, paperback. 704 pages, .
Guillen, Tomas. Serial Killers: Issues Explored Through the Green River Murders. Pearson Prentice Hall, 2007, paperback. 186 pages.

External links

 A copy of Ridgway's infamous letter to the press (PDF)
 
 
 

1949 births
20th-century American criminals
American male criminals
American murderers of children
American people convicted of murder
American prisoners sentenced to life imprisonment
American serial killers
Crime in Washington (state)
Crimes against sex workers in the United States
Criminals from Utah
Criminals from Washington (state)
Fugitives
Living people
Male serial killers
Military personnel from Salt Lake City
Necrophiles
People convicted of murder by Washington (state)
People from Salt Lake City
People from Seattle
People with dyslexia
Prisoners sentenced to life imprisonment by Washington (state)
United States Navy personnel of the Vietnam War
United States Navy sailors
Violence against women in the United States